М11 highway is a part of European route E85. Being 191 km long, it stretches through Hrodna Voblast and part of Brest Voblast in Belarus. The road begins at the Benyakoni border crossing (it is a continuation of  Lithuanian A15 highway) and goes south, passing Voranava, Lida, Dyatlovo and Slonim. It ends at the intersection with P2 near village of Byten.

Roads in Belarus 
International road networks
European route E85